The Camping World Kickoff is an annual college football game played on the opening weekend of the college football season in Orlando, Florida at Camping World Stadium. The game, a collaboration between Florida Citrus Sports and ESPN Events, debuted in 2016 with a Labor Day game between Ole Miss and Florida State.

Camping World was announced as the event's title sponsor in May 2016.

Game results

Rankings are from the AP Poll.

Future games

References

External links
 

College football kickoff games
2016 establishments in Florida
American football in Orlando, Florida
Recurring sporting events established in 2016